Nicolás Francisco Ramírez (born 18 February 1988, in Buenos Aires) is an Argentine footballer, who plays as a right winger for Deportivo Morón.

Career
On 10 April 2008, Ramírez scored his first goal in professional football with a goal described as unforgettable by Clarín to bring his team back to 3-3 after being 0-3 down to Racing Club.

In 2009, Ramírez joined newly promoted Chacarita Juniors, on loan.

References

External links
 Argentine Primera statistics at Futbol XXI
 Lanus Player Profile
 

1988 births
Living people
Footballers from Buenos Aires
Argentine footballers
Argentine expatriate footballers
Association football forwards
Club Atlético Lanús footballers
Chacarita Juniors footballers
Club Atlético Atlanta footballers
Peñarol players
Racing de Olavarría footballers
Unión de Mar del Plata footballers
Club Atlético Los Andes footballers
Deportivo Morón footballers
Argentine Primera División players
Ecuadorian Serie A players
Primera Nacional players
Uruguayan Primera División players
Primera B Metropolitana players
Argentine expatriate sportspeople in Ecuador
Argentine expatriate sportspeople in Uruguay
Expatriate footballers in Ecuador
Expatriate footballers in Uruguay